Ivano-Frankivsk National Medical University (Ukrainian: Івано-Франківський національний медичний університет) is an institute of higher medical education in Ivano-Frankivsk, Ukraine.

The university is situated in Ivano city in the northwest of Ukraine and is a leading higher education establishment in the region, with a higher accreditation level. The university provides continuity of higher medical education: Junior Specialist – a Bachelor – a Medical Specialist – a Master – a post graduate. The university history started in 1945 and is listed in the WHO Directory of Medical Schools and in the US FAIMER International Medical Education Directory (IMED).

The university is one of the few Medical Universities in Ukraine to be designated as a “National Medical University” by the government of Ukraine.

Courses

Majors 
 General Medicine (Doctor of Medicine degree) – 6 years course
 Dentistry (Doctor of Dentistry degree) - 5-year course
 Pediatrics (Doctor of Medicine degree) - 6-year course
 Pharmacy (Bachelor of Pharmacy degree) – 5-year course
 Nursing (RN) - 3 / 4-year course
 Prosthodontics (MDS / Clinical Residency) - 2-year course

Educational and qualification levels 
 Educational and Qualification levels:
 Specialist (MD, MDD)
 Master of Medicine (Pharmacy)
 Ph.D.

Postgraduate training 
 Internship
 Clinical Residentura
 Master and PhD courses
 Specialization and Post-Diploma Training for Doctors

References

External links 
 
 

Education in Ivano-Frankivsk
Universities and institutes established in the Soviet Union
Medical schools in Ukraine
Educational institutions established in 1945
Buildings and structures in Ivano-Frankivsk Oblast
National universities in Ukraine
1945 establishments in the Soviet Union